The 2016 Women's  World Junior Squash Championships is the women's edition of the 2016 World Junior Squash Championships, which serves as the individual world Junior championship for squash players. The event took place in Bielsko-Biała in Poland from 6 to 11 August 2016. Nouran Gohar retain her World Junior title, defeating Rowan Reda Araby in the final.

Seeds

Draw and results

Finals

Top half

Section 1

Section 2

Bottom half

Section 3

Section 4

See also
2016 Men's World Junior Squash Championships
World Junior Squash Championships

References

External links
Women's World Junior Championships 2016 official website

2016 in women's squash
World Junior Squash Championships
Wor
2016 in Polish sport
Squash tournaments in Poland
International sports competitions hosted by Poland